Winki Lai (born 8 July 1986) is a Hong Kong actress and television host. She has been a TVB artiste since 2014.

Early life 
Winki Lai was born in Hong Kong. She studied at ELCHK Ma On Shan Lutheran Primary School and Chinese YMCA College. Lai joined the drama club in secondary school. Although she was admitted to the acting department of the Hong Kong Academy for Performing Arts in Form 5, she gave up the opportunity to advance to university. It was not until two years later that one of her A-level scores failed and she could not enter her desired degree, Lai officially enrolled in the Bachelor of Arts with Honours in the Performing Department of The Hong Kong Academy for Performing Arts. She won the Hong Kong Bank Foundation Hong Kong-Mainland Exchange Scholarship and the Lai Cho-tin Memorial Scholarship during her schooling.

Career 
After graduating in 2011, Lai became a stage actress and radio host. In 2013, she was recommended by her teacher Lo Koon-lan from The Academy of Performing Arts to participate in the audition for the TVB drama Never Dance Alone and set foot in the entertainment industry. During the audition, she played the seven characters alone and was finally selected for the role of the teen version of Hui Chun Nei in the drama. During the filming of the play, producer Eric Tsang asked her to help Rachel Lee, who had been unable to enter the play after she had quit the entertainment industry for many years, to analyze the script. After the drama was broadcast, her performance began to impress viewers.

In 2014, when Lai participated in the drama Lord Of Shanghai, well-known veteran actor Anthony Wong highly praised her, naming her Little Ling (Little Carol Cheng). In 2016, she played the role of Yau Ling-mui in the drama Blue Veins, in which her performance was once again praised by netizens. In 2017, she starred in the drama Destination Nowhere, collaborating with Kevin Cheng for the second time.

On 27 July 2018, Lai switched from the TVB basic artiste contract to the manager contract.

In 2020, Lai was highly praised for her performance and couple collaboration with Owen Cheung, in the comedy drama Al Cappuccino, which earned her first nominations for both Best Supporting Actress and Most Popular Female Character at the TVB Anniversary Awards 2020. She eventually won the former award.

As a stage actress, Lai has performed in a number of troupe works and served as the master of ceremonies for the "23rd Hong Kong Drama Awards". In addition, she has hosted Taoist TV programs broadcast by Now TV, such as Dao Tong Tian Di, Road Express, Life Sweet Silk and Healthy Cooking.

Personal life 

Lai is good friends with Kandy Wong, Annice Ng, Cheronna Ng, Jeannie Chan, Anjaylia Chan and Venus Wong, whom of all had starred in the drama Never Dance Alone. In 2020, Lai, along with Sisley Choi, Jeannie Chan, Stephanie Ho, Anjaylia Chan and Cheronna Ng, formed the friendship group “SÏXTERS”.

In July 2017, Lai announced her pregnancy via Instagram. In August 2017, she married her stage actor boyfriend of 5 years, Benny Leung. On 3 December 2017, she gave birth to their son, Marat.

Filmography

TV Dramas (TVB)

TV Dramas (Shaw Brothers Pictures)

TV Shows

Films

Stage Plays

Radio Programmes

TVC

Songs

TV Drama 
 2014：”Let's Dance” (Never Dance Alone Ending Theme, With Anjaylia Chan, Cheronna Ng, Kandy Wong, Venus Wong & Annice Ng)

Awards and nominations

References

External links 
 
 
 
 
 Dramall - 賴慰玲

1986 births
Living people
TVB actors
Hong Kong television actresses
Hong Kong television presenters
Hong Kong women television presenters
21st-century Hong Kong actresses
Alumni of The Hong Kong Academy for Performing Arts